Tsuen Wan Transport Complex was a large transport hub in Tsuen Wan, Hong Kong. There was a bus terminus and taxi stand on the ground floor; on top sat a multi-storey car park.

Location
Tsuen Wan Transport Complex was located at No. 98 Tai Ho Road, in South Tsuen Wan, near the shore. When it was completed in 1986, it was located next to the Tsuen Wan Town Hall (completed in 1980) and the Tsuen Wan Ferry Pier (demolished in 2000 and rebuilt further south following land reclamation) in an otherwise mostly undeveloped zone of Tsuen Wan New Town. The surrounding area has since then undergone development, and the building later sat next to Clague Garden Estate (1989), Tsuen Wan West station (2003) and Nina Tower (2007).

History
Construction of the Complex started in 1983. The multi-storey car park opened in April 1986. Starting from 1 May 1997, the multi-storey car park was managed by Wilson Parking, taking over from Metropark, a Wharf subsidiary. A driving school operated on the 9th and 10th floors of the building since 1999. As of 2009, the Complex was planned for demolition or partial demolition under the MTR Corporation's TW5 property development project. A case in 2010 about environment nuisances caused by street sleepers dwelling in the Complex, highlighted the fact that it had been unclear since 1986, which Government Department held management responsibility for the Complex. As of February 2012, most of the bus routes using the Complex had relocated their termini elsewhere, and most of the building had fallen into disuse.

Features
With 778 parking spaces for private cars, the multi-storey car park was, as at December 2011, the second largest Transport Department multi-storey car park after Rumsey Street Car Park.

Demolition
The building was of little use in recent years, especially following the relocation of bus stops in the complex to the new bus terminus not long after the completion of Tsuen Wan West station. As the building occupied the site of further planned residential development (known as the TW5 project, and part of the Tsuen Wan West station property development plan), it was due to be closed on 5 February 2013. The remaining minibus services moved out of the building to the nearby Nina Tower bus / minibus station on 27 January 2013.

The multi-storey car park was closed with effect from 1 February 2013, and the transport complex was subsequently demolished. The site will become host to a new private housing estate called "Cityside", developed by Chinachem Group.

See also
 Murray Road Multi-storey Car Park Building
 Yau Ma Tei Car Park Building

References

Further reading

 

Tsuen Wan
Transport infrastructure in Hong Kong
Transport infrastructure completed in 1986
Bus stations in Hong Kong
Former buildings and structures in Hong Kong
Former bus stations
Transport interchange in Hong Kong